The Città di Forlì is a professional tennis tournament played on indoor hard courts. It is currently part of the ATP Challenger Tour. It has been held annually in Forlì, Italy, since 2021.

Past finals

Singles

Doubles

References

ATP Challenger Tour
Hard court tennis tournaments
Tennis tournaments in Italy
Forlì
Recurring sporting events established in 2021